John McNamee (born 11 June 1941) is a Scottish former 
professional footballer who played in more than 280 league games as a defender for Celtic, Hibernian, Newcastle United, Blackburn Rovers, Hartlepool United, and Workington.

McNamee began his senior career with Celtic and played in the 1963 Scottish Cup Final defeat by Rangers. He was then signed by Jock Stein to play for Hibernian in April 1964, but Stein himself moved in the opposite direction early in the next year. McNamee signed for Newcastle United in December 1966, and was part of the team that won the Inter-Cities Fairs Cup in 1969.

After leaving Newcastle in 1971, McNamee played for Blackburn Rovers, Hartlepool United, Lancaster City and Workington (serving as player-manager of the latter) before retiring in 1976.

References

External links
 

1941 births
Footballers from Coatbridge
Living people
Association football central defenders
Scottish footballers
Scottish football managers
Association football player-managers
Celtic F.C. players
Hibernian F.C. players
Newcastle United F.C. players
Blackburn Rovers F.C. players
Hartlepool United F.C. players
Workington A.F.C. players
Scottish Junior Football Association players
Scottish Football League players
English Football League players
Workington A.F.C. managers
Bellshill Athletic F.C. players
Lancaster City F.C. players